The Miss Brazil 2011, the 57th edition of the Miss Brazil pageant, was held in São Paulo on July 23, 2011. The winner was Priscila Machado, who went on to represent Brazil in the 2011 Miss Universe pageant.

Twenty-seven delegates from each state and the Federal District competed for the crown. The current titleholder, Débora Lyra of Minas Gerais, crowned her successor at the end of the event.

Results

Placements

Special Awards
 Miss Internet: Michelly Böhnen
 Miss Congeniality: Renata Lustosa
 Best National Costume: Mariana Figueiredo

Contestants

References

External links
Official Miss Brasil website

2011
2011 in Brazil
2011 beauty pageants